Mamudan (also Romanized as Māmūdān) is a village in Kenar Sar Rural District, Kuchesfahan District, Rasht County, Gilan Province, Iran. At the 2006 census, its population was 403, in 122 families.

References 

Populated places in Rasht County